Bruce Douglas may refer to:

Bruce Douglas (basketball) (born 1964), American basketball player
Bruce Douglas (rugby union) (born 1980), Scottish rugby union player
Bruce L. Douglas (born 1925), American politician in the state of Illinois

See also
Bruce Douglas-Mann (1927–2000), British politician
Douglas Bruce (disambiguation)
Douglas (surname)